Willem "Wim" Sonneveld (28 June 1917 – 8 March 1974) was a Dutch cabaret artist and singer. Together with Toon Hermans and Wim Kan, he is considered to be one of the 'Great Three' of Dutch cabaret. Sonneveld is generally viewed as a Dutch cultural icon for his work and legacy in theatre, musicals and music.

Biography

Wim Sonneveld was born in Utrecht, Netherlands, to Gerrit Sonneveld and Geertruida van den Berg. In 1922, at a very young age, he lost his mother. After his time at school, where he was the class clown, he had a few unsuccessful jobs.

In 1932 he started singing in an amateur choir, the Keep Smiling Singers, after which he teamed up with Fons Goossens in 1934 to form a duo and perform at anniversaries of associations and institutions. Later that year he met reviewer Huub Janssen and after a journey through France in 1936 they started living together in Amsterdam, at first on the Westermarkt, later on the Prinsengracht. In that same year he worked for Louis Davids. During the day he worked as an administrator and in evening he played small roles and sang chansons. In that same period he performed with his partner Huub in his own club De Rarekiek. In 1937 he sang in 'cabarets' (floor shows in nightclubs) with Suzy Solidor and Agnes Capri in France.

After the declaration of war of 1940 he returned to the Netherlands, where he acted in plays and in the revue of Loekie Bouwmeester. In 1940 he performed in the Theater der Prominenten and at Abraham van der Vies' De Sprookjesspelers. Here he met Conny Stuart. In 1943 he formed his own association, consisting among others of Conny Stuart, Lia Dorana, Albert Mol, Joop Doderer, Hetty Blok and Emmy Arbous.

Wim Sonneveld was gay, though not openly as it would have been unacceptable during that era.

He died in 1974 due to a heart attack.

Rim Ram
Between 1943 and 1959 he staged with his own cabaret association Rim Ram a great number of shows:
1943 Alleen voor dames (text by Hella Haasse)
1944 Sprookjes
1944 Opus drie
1945 De bloemetjes buiten
1945 Tingeltangel
1946 Verre reizen
1946 Tutti frutti
1946 Leidscheplein
1947 Vanavond om acht uur
1947 't Is maar comedie
1948 't Is historisch
1949 We spelen pantomime
1949 Iene-miene-mutten
1950 't Is mij een raadsel
1951 Herhalingsoefeningen
1951 Artiestenpension
1952 Boekenfeest
1952 Gastenboek
1952 Het meisje met de grote voeten
1953 Bloemlezing (compilation show)
1953 In de winckel van Sinckel
1954 Waar de blanke top der duinen
1955 Huis tuin en keuken
1957 À la carte
1959 Rim Ram

Willem Parel
A famous creation of Wim Sonneveld was Willem Parel, son and grandson of a Dutch street organ grinder as well as chairman of the En-pé-gé, the Dutch Pearl Association (Nederlands ParelGenootschap). This brought him great success on the VARA-radio in the early fifties. Parel would expose movingly about ‘organ grinding in general and the psychology of the penny cup in particular’. Over time Wim Sonneveld came to hate his creation, but he knew that Willem Parel drew a large audience and he couldn't live from just singing chansons. In 1955 a movie was shot called The Wondrous life of Willem Parel.

Film, musical, solo
Wim Sonneveld has played in some movies: the aforementioned The Wondrous life of Willem Parel as well has the Hollywood thriller The Pink Hippopotamus (1956) and a later the films Silk stockings (1957) and Wasp End (1957).

After 702 performances of the musical My Fair Lady, since 1960, after his own club went bankrupt in 1959, with which he ‘wore out’ three Eliza Doolittles (Margriet de Groot, Dorien Mijksenaar and Jasperina de Jong) in his role as dr. Higgins, he went solo with television shows like Doe es wat, meneer Sonneveld (1962) and Blijf in Holland (1963). In 1964 he again took the stage with Een avond met Wim Sonneveld.

Remarkable was his threefold guest role in episode 16 of the television series  by Annie M.G. Schmidt and Harry Bannink in 1967, as himself, Arie Pruijselaar junior and Arie Pruijselaar senior. His last film was Op de Hollandse toer (1973).

He would have liked to end his career singing French chansons, because his heart lay in France, where he had a house in Roquefort-les-Pins.

On 1974-03-08 Wim Sonneveld died at the age of 56 in the VU hospital in Amsterdam from his second heart attack.

Even though Wim Sonneveld never publicly stated that he was homosexual, he shared his life only with men, first with Hubert Janssen, later with prop designer, text writer and painter Friso Wiegersma (1925–2006) whom he met in 1947 and who created the character Nikkelen Nelis (Nickle Nelis) for him, a character, made from the well-known street singer from Rotterdam, named  (Copper Ko).

Famous characters

Willem Parel
Nikkelen Nelis the street singer
Friar Venantius
The Stable Master

Famous conferences
Artificial insemination
Hello, man behind the counter
Croquettes
Grandfather
The Boys (about the father-problems with the love-life of his just-married 'daughter')

Famous songs
Aan de Amsterdamse grachten
Het dorp (La montagne)
Katootje
Margootje
Tearoom Tango
Zo heerlijk rustig
Daar is de orgelman
In een rijtuigie
Doe het doek maar dicht

Discography

Albums noted in the Dutch Album Top 20/50/100

Singles noted in the Dutch Top 40

Wim Sonneveld Award
Every year since 1988 the Wim Sonneveld Award has been awarded to the most talented performer in cabaret and related arts on the Amsterdams kleinkunstfestival.

References

Een overzicht door Theater Instituut Nederland
Het archief van Beeld & Geluid
Genealogische gegevens Wim Sonneveld in "Genealogie Mostert"

1917 births
1974 deaths
Dutch male comedians
20th-century Dutch male singers
Dutch comedy musicians
Dutch cabaret performers
Dutch gay musicians
Gay singers
Gay comedians
LGBT cabaret performers
Dutch LGBT singers
Entertainers from Utrecht (city)
20th-century comedians
20th-century Dutch LGBT people